Greyworld are a collective of London-based artists who create public-activated art, sculpture and interactive installations. Although often varied in their materials, their work is typically subtle and environmentally reflective, often allowing participants the opportunity to play through the work. The following descriptions are of a few selected artworks.

Beginnings 

In 1993, Andrew Shoben founded art group Greyworld in Paris. Their goal was to create works that articulated public spaces, allowing some form of self-expression in areas of the city that people can see every day but would normally exclude and ignore. Greyworld are now based in London, with permanent works in many major cities around the world.

Works

Railings (1996) 
Their first public work of art was a series of temporary installations, Railings (1996), first created in Paris and widely copied. In each case greyworld took a set of ordinary street railings and tuned them so that when you run a stick or an umbrella along them, rather than making the 'clack-clack-clack' sound as expected, they played The Girl from Ipanema. Often created without permission, several instances of this installation have been removed.

Playground (1999) 
Bridge 2, drew on ideas that Greyworld had explored in a previous work of art Playground, installed in the Yorkshire Sculpture Park in the UK. Visitors to the sculpture park stumbled across what looked like a deserted playground with faded markings for mysterious games and benches for spectators. All the elements of the installation, the floor of the playground and the accompanying benches, were sensitised with tiny sensors so that as people crossed the floor they triggered the sound of people playing a game whilst as others sitting on the bench found themselves immersed in the sound of spectators cheering and clapping. The installation is a permanent feature of the sculpture park.

Bridge 2 (2000) 
 
Most of their early installations were sound based. In 2000, they took the Millennium Bridge which spans the Liffey River in Dublin, Ireland, and installed a bright blue carpet across its length. Embedded into the carpet were hundreds of tiny sensors that translated the motion of people crossing the bridge into a vibrant soundscape. One moment it sounded as if people were walking through crunchy snow, the next that they were sploshing through water, or walking across fallen leaves.

The Source (2004) 
Although they have built up a rich history of acclaimed works since their formation in 1993, their most celebrated piece so far is probably The Source – a permanent installation for the new London Stock Exchange: A cube of 9×9×9 (729 in total) spherical balls are suspended on cables that run the full 32 metres height of the main atrium of the newly designed building. These spheres, controlled by a computer running Python scripts, can move themselves independently of each other, forming dynamic shapes, characters and fluid-like motions that reflects the nature of the stock market itself. The sculpture opens the market each morning at 8am, with the spheres breaking free from their default cube arrangement to form elegant patterns and shapes.

Throughout the day the sculpture responds to reputable news feed and displays snapshots of the current headlines, written in full height of the atrium. At the end of each day's trading the spheres return to their cubed arrangement, resting on the sculpture's base, and blue lights inside each sphere are illuminated to show the stock market's closing price with an arrow to indicate how the market performed on that particular day. Her Majesty Queen Elizabeth II unveiled the sculpture on 27 July 2004 and the opening was broadcast to a global audience. The installation is broadcast every morning on television to an estimated global audience of 80 million people. It was nominated for an Interactive BAFTA award in 2005.

Trace (2005) 

Trace (2005) is a work created for the maze at Hampton Court Palace, UK. Drawing on its history and on the idea of a maze as a place of furtive conversation and flirtation, Greyworld have created a gentle soundwork that affects the visitors' experience of their journey from entrance to the centre and back again. As visitors pass through the many green corridors of the maze, they are tempted to follow tantalising sounds – a fragment of music, a snatch of laughter, the seductive rustle of fine silks or the whispers of an illicit conversation as it disappears around a corner and into a dead-end. Slowly the sounds weave together in the visitors mind to create a rich tapestry of the other people who have passed through the maze over the centuries and lost themselves in the seductive privacy of its secluded corners.

Bins and Benches (2005) 
Later that year they also created Bins and Benches a permanent installation for a public square in Cambridge, UK. It features a group of animated street furniture that roam free, like buffalo, in the urban savannah of their square. When it rains the benches seek shelter under the nearby trees, inviting people to sit on them. As the temperature drops the bins start to shiver and when the sun shines the bins and benches break into song, singing in tight barbershop harmonies. Above all the bins and benches are still functional pieces of street furniture waiting for people to come and sit on them or deposit rubbish in their lids.

Worldbench (2005) 

Worldbench (2005) is an installation that uses a park bench to link up locations across the world. It takes an ordinary wooden bench and places it up against a screen, attached to a wall in the school's playground. Reflected on the screen is the mirror image of the bench, disappearing into the distance; but whilst one side of the bench is in South London for example, the other could be in the north of England, or the other side of the world. Four Worldbenches have been created, with many more to be installed around the globe.

Monument to the Unknown Artist (2007) 
In 2007, Greyworld launched Monument to the Unknown Artist beside the Tate Modern on London's Bankside. A permanent installation, it garnered the interest of the world's media.
 
At first glance the installation would appear to be a simple bronze statue, dressed in a neck scarf and loose fitting suit. However, the  monument seeks inspiration from passers-by, inviting them to strike poses which he copies, continually changing his form in a light-hearted and mischievous way. The unique sculpture offers an alternative and accessible creative experience for the public, allowing them to create a dialogue with the work of art.

Bloom (2007) 

Their installation for a new Fosters and partners development in London's Spitalfields launched in 2007. Occupying the full height of the building's central 10-storey atrium it uses hundreds of flowers, hidden within a seemingly sober column suspended within the space, to allow the building to bloom into life. They respond to the motion of those passing by, opening and closing, thus allowing every viewer interaction and influence over their environment.

Invisible (2007) 

In 2006 Channel 4 chose 7 sites across the United Kingdom to be part of The Big Art project. Burnley, East Lancashire was one of seven sites chosen to take part. 15 young people from throughout the region commissioned the artist group Greyworld to create a piece of public art in the town. The artwork, called "Invisible," is a series of nineteen ultraviolet paintings placed around the town center displaying "public heroes" – outstanding local citizens who have left their mark in the town. The glowing paintings are best seen at night time. They appear as the nights grow longer, throughout the year.

Clockwork Forest (2011) 
A series of clockwork keys appeared throughout the Ridding Wood trail, in the Grizedale Forest, UK in October 2011. Each key, when turned, generated a music box melody, that can be heard coming from the branches. A permanent work, it was commissioned by the National Forestry Commission.

Trafalgar Sun (2012) 

For their most recent artwork, greyworld created a large spherical self illuminated "Sun" which was installed in Trafalgar Square, London for one day only. Weighing 2.5 tons, and using 210,000 watts of power, the Sun illuminated the Square for three hours after sunset.

References

External links
 Greyworld Official website
 Chris O'Shea interviews Greyworld
 Icon magazine feature on Greyworld
 We-make-money-not-art has lunch with Greyworld
 Bubbletank (2003) experiment
 Bruce Sterling blogs about Railings (1996) for Wired Magazine
 Trafalgar Sun report

English artist groups and collectives
English contemporary artists
Outdoor sculptures in London